is a Japanese comedian, actor, voice actor, singer and presenter from Shijōnawate, Osaka. He is a graduate of the Osaka Prefecture North Shijōnawate Senior High School. He is currently attached to the Yoshimoto Creative Agency. He is best known as the boke half of the Manzai act "DonDokoDon" alongside tsukkomi Keiji Hirahata.

Appearances

Television

Variety shows 
 Egao Ga Gochisō: Uchigohan (TV Asahi)
 Gussan Chi ~The Good Sun House~ (Tōkai Television Broadcasting)
 Gutto! Chikyū Bin (Yomiuri Telecasting Corporation)
 Kazuyoshi Morita Hour: Waratte Iitomo (Thursday regular) (Fuji Television)
 Lincoln (TBS)
 NIJIIRO JEAN (Kansai Telecasting Corporation, Fuji Television)
 Nippon Jūdan Okazu Hakken! Route 88 (Chūkyō Television Broadcasting, Nippon Television)
 One Stop! (TBS)
 Tensai! Shimura Dōbutsu En (Nippon Television)
 Ucchassa (BS Fuji, Yoshimoto Fandango TV)
  (Fuji Television)

Drama 
 Shinsengumi! (NHK taiga drama, 2004), Nagakura Shinpachi
 Kamen Rider Gaim (TV Asahi, 2013), DJ Sagara
 Daddy Sister (NHK asadora, 2016)
 Maiagare! (NHK asadora, 2022–23), Masaru Umezu

Other 
 Hook no Tatsujin (NHK BS2)
 MTV Video Music Awards Japan (2004 host)

Film 
 Yaji and Kita: The Midnight Pilgrims (2005) (Ochin)
 Kamen Rider × Kamen Rider Gaim & Wizard: The Fateful Sengoku Movie Battle (2013) (DJ Sagara)
 Demon Girl (2020) (Daitetsu Onigawara)

Japanese dub 
 Johnny English (Johnny English (Rowan Atkinson))

Theatrical voicework 
 Cars (Mater, Japanese dub)
 Cars 2 (Mater, Japanese dub)
 Cars 3 (Mater, Japanese dub)
 Mind Game (Ryō)
 Shark Tale (Lenny, Japanese dub)
 Planes (Bravo, Japanese dub)

Impression repertoire 
 After-hours brass band club music
 Show Aikawa
 Kiyoshi Atsumi
 Budgerigar
 Chocoball Mukai
 Cicada
 Demon Kogure
 Faraway festival
 Fireworks
 Giichi Fujimoto
 Gucchi Yūzō chorus
 Koji Higashino
 Kyosuke Himuro
 Hollywood film scenes (horror, war, crime, etc.)
 Hollywood star interviewer
 Kazuyuki Izutsu
 Jumpy Compact Disc
 Unsuku Kei
 Kōji Kikkawa
 Manfuku Kin
 Ryō Kinomoto
 Masahiro Kuwana
 Keisuke Kuwata
 Hiroki Matsukata
 Eiji Minakata
 Hibari Misora
 Yoshinori Monta
 Mr. Bean
 Tsuyoshi Nagabuchi
 Akira Nakao
 Gorō Naya (as Kōichi Zenigata)
 Nogeyama Zoo lion
 Takashi Okamura
 Kōhei Ōtomo
 Passion Yara
 Rikiya (Rikiya Yasuoka)
 Hideki Saijō
 Motoharu Sano
 Shinkansen passing by
 Showa era radio
 Table tennis
 Junpei Takiguchi
 The Terminator
 Tom and Jerry dog
 Variety show commercial cameraman
 Wideshow reporter
 Hiroyuki Yabe
 Shingo Yanagisawa
 Takajin Yashiki
 Eikichi Yazawa
 Ikuzo Yoshi

References

External links 
 Official site 
 

1969 births
Japanese impressionists (entertainers)
Japanese male singers
Japanese male voice actors
Living people
People from Shijōnawate